Dourdan-la-Forêt is a train station in Dourdan near Paris. It is served by Paris' express suburban rail system, the RER.

See also 
 List of stations of the Paris RER

External links 

 

Réseau Express Régional stations
Railway stations in Essonne